This is a list of the top 50 singles in New Zealand of 1984 as compiled by Recorded Music NZ in the end-of-year chart of the Official New Zealand Music Chart. Only one single by a New Zealand artist is included on the chart, however it was the highest selling single of the year, Pātea Māori Club's debut single "Poi E".

Chart 
Key
 – Single of New Zealand origin

References 

1984 in music
1984 record charts
Singles 1984